The 18th National Hockey League All-Star Game took place at Maple Leaf Gardens on October 10, 1964. The NHL All-Stars defeated the hometown Toronto Maple Leafs 3–2.

All-Star uniforms
The unusual shoulder loops introduced to the All-Star jerseys in 1960 gave way to more traditional striping. The shoulder yoke featured a thin orange-black-orange stripe on the front and back, and the sleeves and waist featured a pair of orange-black-orange stripes. The ends of the sleeves and waistline were black. The orange tie-up collar from the previous set remained, and the two large orange stars outlined in black on the front of the jersey were matched with another pair of stars on the back. The player numbers on the front and back of the jersey were displayed in plain black block numbers. The jerseys would continue to be used through the 1970 game - the league would actually continue to reuse the actual game jerseys year after year until they needed to be replaced.

The game
Both Johnny Bower of the Toronto Maple Leafs and the All-Stars' Glenn Hall of the Chicago Black Hawks were unbeatable through the first half of the game. However, in the second half, the All-Stars managed to put three pucks behind Terry Sawchuk while the Leafs could only score twice on Charlie Hodge of the Montreal Canadiens. Montreal's Jean Béliveau scored the go-ahead goal, on assists from Chicago's Bobby Hull and Gordie Howe of the Detroit Red Wings, late in the second period. Murray Oliver of the Boston Bruins and Jim Pappin of the Leafs traded goals in the third. Hodge became the first goaltender to be penalized in the eighteen-year history of the All-Star game when he was whistled down in the second period for holding the puck.

Game summary

Referee: John Ashley
Linesmen: Neil Armstrong and Matt Pavelich
Attendance: 14,232

Rosters

References 

National Hockey League All-Star Games
All-Star Game
1964
Ice hockey competitions in Toronto
October 1964 sports events in Canada
1964 in Toronto